Pieces of You is the debut studio album by American singer-songwriter Jewel, released on February 28, 1995, by Atlantic Records. It was produced by Ben Keith, who has also produced works for artists such as Neil Young and Patsy Cline. Featuring acoustic guitar-based songs written when Jewel was a teenager, the album is composed of both live recordings from 1994 at The Innerchange, a coffeehouse in San Diego, and studio recordings completed at Neil Young's personal studio in Redwood City, California.

After its release in February 1995, the album initially failed to chart. Two years later, in 1997, Bob Dylan invited Jewel to tour with him as his opening act, which gave the album widespread public exposure. The single "Who Will Save Your Soul" eventually received airplay, and the album peaked at number four on the US Billboard 200, almost exactly two years after its release. Other hits included were "Foolish Games" and "You Were Meant for Me", as well as the UK single "Morning Song". After two years, the album was re-released featuring the re-recorded versions of "You Were Meant for Me" and "Foolish Games". Despite a mixed critical response, the album is listed at number 64 of the "Definitive 200" by the Rock and Roll Hall of Fame.

Pieces of You was certified 12-times platinum by the Recording Industry Association of America (RIAA) on January 30, 2006, denoting shipments in excess of 12 million copies in the United States. As of June 2010, the album had sold over 7.3 million copies in the US, becoming one of the best-selling debut albums of all time.

On September 28, 2020, Jewel announced that the album would be re-released in celebration of the 25th anniversary of the album's release. It was released through Craft Recordings in multiple formats including the original album remastered, alongside a four-disc box set containing B-sides, demos, outtakes, and live performances of the album's songs.

Background
The bulk of the songs featured on Pieces of You were written by Jewel between the ages of 16 and 19; she has said that "Who Will Save Your Soul" specifically was written while she was busking during a hitchhiking trip she took by herself over spring break from the Interlochen Center for the Arts, where she had been studying on a vocal scholarship.

While living in San Diego, California, Jewel managed to amass a local following while performing in coffee houses and local bars, which resulted in a bootleg being broadcast on 91X FM. Jewel then became subject of a bidding war between labels, eventually signing with Atlantic Records.

Recording
Several tracks on Pieces of You were recorded live in 1994 at the Innerchange, a San Diego coffeehouse where Jewel was a regular performer. The remainder of the album was recorded in Neil Young's studio at Broken Arrow Ranch in Redwood City, California, under the supervision of producer Ben Keith. Jewel told Time about the recording process:
"[...] Typically I've had difficulty in the studio. I don't sing as raw, it's just a bit more tame. I'm a live singer who's always fed off the energy of the audience. In a studio, you're just looking at a wall—it feels very odd to me. I've been a live performer since I was six years old. The reason I recorded the album live with the band was so that I could play guitar, which I usually never do in the studio, while I sing at the same time. The band was accustomed to following singer-songwriters and feeling for me slowing down and speeding up. It has a real ebb and a flow and a naturalness that didn't inhibit my singing or performance."
In her 2015 memoir, Never Broken: Songs Are Only Half the Story, she described Pieces of You as "imperfect, full of mistakes and guitar flubs", but also "honest".

Reception

Upon its initial release in 1995, the album received little attention, after which Jewel was invited to tour as the opener for Bob Dylan, which helped garner more public attention. Two of the album's singles were re-recorded for a 1997 re-release of the album.

David Browne of Entertainment Weekly gave the album a negative review upon its 1997 re-release, noting, "Pieces of You remains a wimpily produced batch of songs – so ineffectual that both 'Who Will Save Your Soul?' and 'You Were Meant for Me' had to be rerecorded for release as singles. It's best considered as a guided tour through three decades of female folk-pop styles," comparing it negatively to Joni Mitchell and Kate Bush. Robert Christgau of The Village Voice also gave the album a starkly negative review, writing: "With the possible exception of Saint Joan, who at least had some stature, this is the bad folkie joke to end all bad folkie jokes."

Sarah Sytsma of AllMusic gave the album a positive review, calling it "a charming collection of light alternative folk-rock from the teenage singer/songwriter. Her songs are occasionally naive, but her melodies can usually save her lyrics." In his review for AllMusic, Stephen Thomas Erlewine wrote: "Pieces of You is a charming debut that is somewhat undone by its own naïveté. Jewel has a rich voice and an innocent, beguiling charm that makes 'Who Will Save Your Soul,' 'I'm Sensitive,' and 'You Were Meant for Me' – songs with slight, simple lyrics and catchy, sweet melodies – quite endearing; they sound like a high-school diary brought to life. [...] Pieces of You has enough charm to make it an ingratiating debut, even if the album doesn't quite fulfill Jewel's potential."

Track listing

25th anniversary edition

Personnel
Musicians

Charts

Weekly charts

Year-end charts

Decade-end charts

Certifications and sales

See also
 List of best-selling albums in the United States

Notes

References

Bibliography
 
 

1995 debut albums
Albums produced by Ben Keith
Atlantic Records albums
Jewel (singer) albums